Sofía Elizabeth Ramos Rodríguez (born 25 August 2003) is a Mexican racewalker who specializes in the 10,000 m walk. She was the gold medallist at the World Athletics U20 Championships in 2021.

References

External links 
 

 

2003 births
Living people
Mexican female racewalkers
World Athletics U20 Championships winners
Athletes (track and field) at the 2018 Summer Youth Olympics
21st-century Mexican women